Cadmus (Brachycaulus) colossus,  or Cadmus colossus, is a species of beetle in the subfamily, Cryptocephalinae, or case-bearing leaf beetles, and the subgenus, Brachycaulus. It was first described by Félicien Chapuis in 1875, from a male specimen collected at Port Denison. It is native to Australia, being found in New South Wales and Queensland.

The taxonomic reasoning for the subgeneric arrangement (accepted by the Australian Faunal Directory) is given in Mathews and Reid (2002).

References

External links
iNaturalist: images of Cadmus colossus, Cooktown, QLD

Beetles described in 1875
Cryptocephalinae
Taxa named by Félicien Chapuis